Trubatsa longicornis is a species of sea snail, a marine gastropod mollusk in the family Muricidae, the murex snails or rock snails.

Description
The length of the shell attains 8.6 mm.

Distribution
Yhis marine species occurs off Guadeloupe.

References

 Houart, R, Buge, B. & Zuccon, D. (2021). A taxonomic update of the Typhinae (Gastropoda: Muricidae) with a review of New Caledonia species and the description of new species from New Caledonia, the South China Sea and Western Australia. Journal of Conchology. 44(2): 103–147.

External links
 Dall, W. H. (1888). Gasteropods and lamellibranchs. In: Agassiz A. (ed.) Three cruises of the United States Coast and Geodetic Survey Steamer “Blake” in the Gulf of Mexico, in the Caribbean Sea, and along the Atlantic coast of the United States, from 1877 to 1880, 2(8): 62-76. Houghton, Mifflin and Company, Boston and New York. 2 volumes

longicornis
Gastropods described in 1888